Borkower See is a lake in the Ludwigslust-Parchim district in Mecklenburg-Vorpommern, Germany. At an elevation of 36 m, its surface area is 0.196 km².

Lakes of Mecklenburg-Western Pomerania